The convex mirror is a c 1916 oil with pencil on wood panel painting by Australian artist George Washington Lambert.

The work depicts the interior of Belwethers, a cottage in Cranleigh, a village in Surrey in southern England.

Lambert was influenced in the creation of this work by the late-Renaissance artist Parmigianino's 1520s painting Self-portrait in a Convex Mirror.

Lambert's friend, artist Thea Proctor said The convex mirror "has the exquisite finish of the Dutch Masters, and shows that a present-day artist could also paint small things in a large manner."

The painting was acquired by the State Library of New South Wales in 2012 as part of a bequest from art collector Helen Selle.

References

Paintings by George Washington Lambert
1916 paintings